Coffey may refer to:


People
 Coffey (surname)
 Coffey Anderson (born 1978), American country and gospel singer and songwriter

Places
 Coffey, Missouri, a city in Daviess County, Missouri
 Coffey County, Kansas
 Coffey County Airport, an airport in Burlington, Kansas
 Coffey Stadium, a stadium in Fairfax, Virginia

Other uses
 Coffey the Dog, Australian shepherd performing in the 2012 German children's film Famous Five

See also
 Coffee (disambiguation)
 Cofie